Clofexamide (or amichlophene) is an antidepressant that was a component of the drug combination clofezone, the other being the nonsteroidal anti-inflammatory drug (NSAID) phenylbutazone. Clofezone was used to treat joint and muscular pain, but is not marketed any more.

References 

Antidepressants
Diethylamino compounds